Boylestone is a village and civil parish in the Derbyshire Dales district of Derbyshire, England.  According to the 2001 census it had a population of 165, increasing to 318 at the 2011 Census.   The village is situated about eight miles east of Uttoxeter.

The village also has a Church and Village Hall. The church is 14th century with a tower added in 1844 by Henry Duesbury.

There is no active Women's Institute but there is a Ladies' Group and an "Evergreen" club. The pub sponsors a football club in the local "summer league"

The cartoonist Bill Tidy formerly lived in the village.

History
Boylestone was mentioned in the Domesday book as belonging to Henry de Ferrers and being worth thirty shillings.

See also
Listed buildings in Boylestone

References

External links

Villages in Derbyshire
Derbyshire Dales
Civil parishes in Derbyshire